In Greek and Roman mythology, Aura (or Αὔρη ) is a minor deity, whose name means "breeze". The plural form, Aurae is sometimes found. According to Nonnus, Aura was the daughter of the Titan Lelantos and the mother, by Dionysus, of Iacchus, a minor deity connected with the Eleusinian mysteries, while Quintus Smyrnaeus makes the Aurae daughters of Boreas, the North-wind. Aurae was the title of a play by the Athenian comic poet Metagenes, who was contemporary with Aristophanes, Phrynichus, and Plato.

Mythology

Nonnus 
Nonnus' tells the story of the rape of Aura, by Dionysus, in the final book of his epic poem the Dionysiaca (early 5th century). In this account, Aura is the nymph daughter of the Titan Lelantos. Nonnus seems to imply that Aura's mother was the wife of Lenatos, the Oceanid nymph Periboia, although elsewhere, he calls Aura the "daughter of Cybele".

Aura was a resident of Phrygia and companion of the goddess Artemis. She was "Aura the Windmaid", as fast as the wind,  "the mountain maiden of Rhyndacos", a "manlike" virgin, "who knew nothing of Aphrodite", and huntress, who "ran down the wild bear" and "ravening lions", and  "kept aloof from the notions of unwarlike maids".

Nonnus describes Aura as follows:

One day, Aura goes hunting with Artemis. For relief from the midday heat, the hunting party stops for a swim. Aura then teases Artemis, saying that her breasts were better than Artemis's, since hers were small and round like a man's, while Artemis's were large and voluptuous like a woman's, and so belied Artemis' supposed "unviolated maidenhood". Deeply offended, the angry Artemis goes to Nemesis, the goddess of divine retribution, who arranges for Aura to be punished by losing her virginity. Dionysus is made mad with desire for Aura, by an arrow from the bow of Eros. But knowing that he will never be able to seduce the obdurately virginal Aura, Dionysus drugs Aura with wine, ties her up, and rapes her while she is unconscious and unmoving. When Aura awakes, discovering she is no longer a virgin, but not knowing who is responsible, enraged, she "made empty the huts of the mountainranging herdsmen and drenched the hills with blood". After a painful labor, Aura gives birth to twin boys. She gives them to a lioness to eat, but it refuses to do so. So Aura seizes one of the boys, flings it high into the air, and after it falls back to hit the ground, she eats it. However, Artemis spirits the other child safely away. Aura then drowns herself in the river Sangarios, where Zeus turned her into a spring:

According to Nonnus, Aura's surviving child by Dionysus, is Iacchus, a minor deity connected with the Eleusinian mysteries, although other accounts have Iacchus, when not identified with Dionysus himself, the son of Demeter or Persephone.

The only other account of Aura's rape is recounted in the twelfth-century lexicon Etymologicum Magnum, according to which Aura was a Phrygian maiden who hunted with Artemis. Dionysus saw her and raped her, after which Artemis threatened to kick her out of her company. In fear, Aura fled to the town of Cyzicus, where she gave birth to twins (whose gender, names and identities are not revealed). Thus the mountain nearby got its name, 'Dindymon' ("twin"), after Aura's children.

Ovid 
The Augustan poet Ovid, in the Ars Amatoria and  again in the Metamorphoses, introduces Aura into the tragic story of Cephalus and Procris, perhaps playing on the verbal similarity of Aura and Aurora, the Roman goddess of the dawn (Greek Eos), who was Cephalus' lover.

In the Metamorphoses, Ovid has Cephalus tell how it was his habit, that after finishing a hunt, he would seek out the cooling breeze:

But one day, as Cephalus tells: "Some one overhearing these words was deceived by their double meaning; and, thinking that the word ‘Aura’ so often on my lips was a nymph’s name, was convinced that I was in love with some nymph." When Cephalus' words were reported to his wife Procris, she was stricken with grief and fear, over, according to Cephalus, a "mere nothing" and "an empty name". The next day after a successful morning's hunt, Cephalus cried out again: "Come, Aura, come and soothe my toil" but when he said this Cephalus thought he heard a groan and called out: "Come, dearest". Then hearing the rustle of leaves, he threw his javelin, at what he thought was some animal, but was instead Procris, who had come to spy on her husband. With her dying breath Procris says: "By the union of our love, by the gods above and my own gods, by all that I have done for you, and by the love that still I bear you in my dying hour, the cause of my own death, I beg you, do not let this Aura take my place." And Cephalus says: "And then I knew at last that it was a mistake in the name".

Iconography 

Extant images of Aura from antiquity are rare. There are only two which can be identified as Aura by inscription.  The oldest is a fifth-century BC skyphos from Taranto, now in the Nicholson Museum, University of Sydney (53.30), which shows a figure labeled "Aura", seated on a rock by the sea, with velificatio, a billowing garment that forms an arch overhead. The other is found on a volute-krater funerary vase (c. 370–350 BC), now in the British Museum (F277).  Depicted on its neck is a polos-crowned head with curls, and the inscription "Aura" above the polos crown.

Influenced by Pliny's description, a pair of velificantes (figures framed by a velificatio) that appear on the Ara Pacis Augustae ("Altar of Augustan Peace") have often been identified as Aurae, although this identification has been criticized, and many other identications have been proposed.

Aurae can resemble Nereids, from whom they are distinguishable mainly by the absence of marine imagery. The female figures with  wind-blown drapery, which adorned the Nereid Monument at Xanthos, though usually identified as Nereids, have sometimes been identified as Aurae.

Aura is sometimes identified as the female figure carried by Zephyr in Sandro Botticelli's painting The Birth of Venus.

See also 
 Metamorphoses in Greek mythology
 Nicaea
 Greco-Roman mysteries

Notes

References
 Bernabé and García-Gasco, "Nonnus and Dionysiac-Orphic Religion" in Brill’s Companion to Nonnus of Panopolis, editor Domenico Accorinti, BRILL, 2016. .
 Canciani, Fulvio, "Aurai" in Lexicon Iconographicum Mythologiae Classicae (LIMC) III.1 Artemis Verlag, Zürich and Munich, 1981. . pp. 52–54.
 Davidson, James, The Greeks and Greek Love, Random House, Inc., 2009. .
de Grummond, Nancy Thomson, "Pax Augusta and the Horae on the Ara Pacis Augustae", AJA 94, No. 4 (Oct 1990), 663-677. 
 Green, Peter, From Ikaria to the Stars: Classical Mythification, Ancient and Modern, University of Texas Press, 2004. Online version at ProQuest Ebook Central.
 Grimal, Pierre, The Dictionary of Classical Mythology, Wiley-Blackwell, 1996, .
 Hadjittofi, Fotini, "Chapter 6: Major Themes and Motifs in the Dionysiaca, in Brill’s Companion to Nonnus of Panopolis, editor Domenico Accorinti, BRILL, 2016. .
 Nonnus, Dionysiaca; translated by Rouse, W H D, I Books I–XV. Loeb Classical Library No. 344, Cambridge, Massachusetts, Harvard University Press; London, William Heinemann Ltd. 1940. Internet Archive
 Nonnus, Dionysiaca; translated by Rouse, W H D, III Books XXXVI–XLVIII. Loeb Classical Library No. 346, Cambridge, Massachusetts, Harvard University Press; London, William Heinemann Ltd. 1940. Internet Archive
 Ovid, Ars Amatoria in Art of Love. Cosmetics. Remedies for Love. Ibis. Walnut-tree. Sea Fishing. Consolation. Translated by J. H. Mozley. Revised by G. P. Goold. Loeb Classical Library No. 232, Cambridge, Massachusetts: Harvard University Press, 1929. Online version at Harvard University Press.
 Ovid. Metamorphoses, Volume I: Books 1-8. Translated by Frank Justus Miller. Revised by G. P. Goold. Loeb Classical Library No. 42. Cambridge, Massachusetts: Harvard University Press, 1916. Online version at Harvard University Press.
 Pliny the Elder, The Natural History (eds. John Bostock, M.D., F.R.S. H.T. Riley, Esq., B.A.) London. Taylor and Francis, Red Lion Court, Fleet Street. (1855). (Online version at the Perseus Digital Library.)
 Quintus Smyrnaeus, Quintus Smyrnaeus: The Fall of Troy, Translator: A.S. Way; Harvard University Press, Cambridge MA, 1913. Internet Archive
 Robinson, Thurstan (1995), "The Nereid Monument at Xanthos or the Eliyãna at Arñna?", Oxford Journal of Archaeology, 14 (3): 355–359. doi:10.1111/j.1468-0092.1995.tb00069.x
 Servius, Commentary on the Aeneid of Vergil, Georgius Thilo, Ed. 1881. Online version at the Perseus Digital Library.
Simon, Erika Ara Pacis Augustae, New York Graphic Society LTD, Greenwich, Conn. 1967.
 Smith, William; Dictionary of Greek and Roman Biography and Mythology, London (1873).
 Spaeth, Babette Stanley, "The Goddess Ceres in the Ara Pacis Augustae and the Carthage Relief," American Journal of Archaeology 98 (1994), pp. 65–100.
 Trendall, A. D. Red Figure Vases of South Italy and Sicily, London, 1989.
 Zanker, Paul, The Power of Images in the Age of Augustus, University of Michigan Press, 1988, 1990.

External links 
 AURA from The Theoi Project

Sky and weather goddesses
Wind deities
Greek goddesses
Roman goddesses
Mythological rape victims
Deeds of Artemis
Consorts of Dionysus
Metamorphoses characters
Anatolian characters in Greek mythology
Metamorphoses into bodies of water in Greek mythology
Retinue of Artemis
Deeds of Eros